Magesi FC is a football club located in Moletši, Kgabo Park, Limpopo, South Africa. The club were established in 2011.

History 
The club was originally called Tambo FC and won promotion from SAB league to ABC Motsepe league and changed name. The club was a fierce rival of Baroka FC during their time together at the Limpopo ABC Motsepe league along with Dolphins FC. Magesi FC is a regular contender in the Nedbank Cup representing the lower league from Limpopo. Their best finish was reaching the round of 16 in 2016 where they played and lost 6-0 to Bidvest Wits.

The club won the Limpopo Stream of the 2015–16 SAFA Second Division, and followed this up by winning their playoff group to earn promotion to the 2016–17 National First Division. They were relegated the following season.

They again won the Limpopo Stream of the 2021–22 SAFA Second Division and earned promotion to the 2022–23 National First Division in the playoffs, getting to the final where they lost 1-0 to MM Platinum.

Honours 

SAFA Second Division: 2015–16
SAFA Second Division, Limpopo Stream: 2013–14, 2014–15, 2015–16, 2021–22

Notes

References 

Soccer clubs in South Africa
Association football clubs established in 2011
National First Division clubs
2011 establishments in South Africa
Magesi F.C.